Aeolosoma hemprichi is an aquatic annelid and the smallest known species of the family Aeolosomatidae. It is usually found in freshwater environments in various parts of the world.

References 

Annelids
Freshwater animals